The Our Lady of Sorrows Church in Bernalillo, New Mexico is a historic church on U.S. Route 85/I-25. It was built in 1857 and added to the National Register of Historic Places in 1977.

It is a cruciform-shaped  stuccoed adobe brick building which served as a church for over 100 years.  An adjacent modern brick church replaced it in 1971.

See also

National Register of Historic Places listings in Sandoval County, New Mexico

References

External links

Roman Catholic churches in New Mexico
Churches on the National Register of Historic Places in New Mexico
Roman Catholic churches completed in 1857
Buildings and structures in Sandoval County, New Mexico
National Register of Historic Places in Sandoval County, New Mexico
1857 establishments in New Mexico Territory